Boris “Bo” Saris (born 3 October 1980) is a Dutch contemporary soul singer-songwriter. In 2004 he won the Dutch talent show Idols.

Biography
Saris was born in Venlo, Netherlands. He was the winner of the second edition of the Dutch talent show Idols. Following a series of successful albums in the Netherlands, he moved to London.

His first release under the moniker “Bo Saris“, he released the song She's On Fire, which peaked at number 5 in the Dutch Alternative Music charts in August 2012.
The EP release included remixes by house music producer Maya Jane Coles and drum and bass producer Calibre. Both had a limited vinyl release.

He is also featured on the Chase & Status song "Breathing" from their 2013 album Brand New Machine.

Bo has released two EPs – The Addict and Little Bit More – Remixes. His album, GOLD, was released in May 2014. The single She's On Fire was featured in the movie Fifty Shades Of Grey.

In 2016 he released a new EP, called Best Of Me. Just before that he experienced difficulties in his life which had to do with his band and company Bo-Rush Productions. He incorporated his emotions and experiences in the lyrics of these songs for this EP. In 2017 he released an EP again, called B-Funk. With this EP Bo expresses his love for funk, and influences of Prince and Barry White are noticeable.

With the help of a crowdfunding Bo released his latest album in April 2018, called NEON. The single, also called NEON, is released shortly before. The second single All Night is released on 13 July 2018.

Discography

As Boris

Albums

Singles

As featuring artist
2005: "No Sunrise" – Relax (feat. Bo-Rush) (#20, NL)

As Bo Saris

Singles

References

External links
Bo Saris Official Website
Bo Saris on Facebook

1980 births
Living people
Dutch pop singers
Dutch soul singers
People from Venlo
21st-century Dutch singers